George Birrell Moodie (22 October 1872 – 4 June 1954) was an Australian rules footballer who played for the Melbourne Football Club in the early years of the Victorian Football League (VFL).

A strongly built yet durable ruck shepherd, Moodie played alongside champions Fred McGinis and Vic Cumberland. He started out at Melbourne in their Victorian Football Association days and then played in their first nine VFL seasons. Moodie was a three time Victorian interstate representative and a member of Melbourne's 1900 premiership team.

In early 1916, at the age of 43, he enlisted to serve in World War I but did not see active service.

References

External links

Demonwiki profile

1872 births
Melbourne Football Club players
1954 deaths
Australian rules footballers from Melbourne
Brighton Football Club players
Melbourne Football Club (VFA) players
Melbourne Football Club Premiership players
One-time VFL/AFL Premiership players
People from South Melbourne